Dick Atkinson (born 30 June 1934) is a former Australian rules footballer who played with Melbourne in the Victorian Football League (VFL).

See also
 Australian football at the 1956 Summer Olympics

Notes

External links 

1934 births
Australian rules footballers from Victoria (Australia)
Melbourne Football Club players
Old Melburnians Football Club players
Living people